Risto Juhani Laakkonen (born 6 May 1967) is a Finnish former ski jumper.

Career
He won a gold medal in the team large hill competition at the 1992 Winter Olympics in Albertville.

His biggest successes were at the FIS Nordic World Ski Championships, where he won two medals in the team large hill event (gold: 1989, silver: 1991). At the World Cup level, he won the 1989 Four Hills Tournament without winning a single competition.

World Cup

Standings

Wins

References
 
 
 

1967 births
Living people
People from Kuopio
Finnish male ski jumpers
Olympic gold medalists for Finland
Olympic ski jumpers of Finland
Ski jumpers at the 1988 Winter Olympics
Ski jumpers at the 1992 Winter Olympics
Olympic medalists in ski jumping
FIS Nordic World Ski Championships medalists in ski jumping
Medalists at the 1992 Winter Olympics
Sportspeople from North Savo
20th-century Finnish people